Pierre-Yves Roussel (born November 7, 1965) is CEO of Tory Burch LLC, a role he assumed in 2019. He was previously the chairman and chief executive officer of LVMH Fashion Group and a member of the LVMH Executive Committee before moving into an advisory role at the luxury conglomerate in 2018.

Early life and education 
Roussel was born in Paris, France. He graduated from ESCP Europe with a degree in Economics. He has a postgraduate degree from Brussels University (Solvay Business School), which he earned during the time he worked at Crédit Commercial de France in Brussels. Roussel has an MBA from Wharton Business School – University of Pennsylvania.

Career 
He began his career as a financial analyst at Crédit Commercial de France, now known as HSBC France after obtaining an MBA from Wharton, he joined the consulting firm McKinsey & Company, where he had increasing responsibilities (France, New York, Hong Kong, Japan) before being elected partner in 1998, and then senior partner in 2004.

In 2004, Roussel joined the LVMH  Executive Committee as Executive Vice President, Strategy and Operations. In 2006, he was named Chairman and Chief Executive Officer of LVMH Fashion Group, which includes Berluti,   Céline, Donna Karan, DKNY, Givenchy, Kenzo, Loewe, Marc Jacobs, Pucci, Nicholas Kirkwood, Louis Vuitton, and J. W. Anderson.

Pierre-Yves Roussel successfully repositioned and developed several fashion houses within LVMH by appointing and collaborating with very talented Artistic Directors: Riccardo Tisci at Givenchy, Phoebe Philo at Céline, Carol Lim and Humberto Leon at Kenzo, J. W. Anderson at Loewe and, in 2015, Dao Yi Chow and Maxwell Osborne at Donna Karan

Memberships 
 ANDAM Fashion Award: Jury member
 The Business of Fashion: Board member
 CFDA Fashion Incubator: Jury Member
 Fédération Française de la Couture, du Prêt-à-Porter des Couturiers et des Créateurs de Mode: Board member
 LVMH Prize: Jury member

Personal life 
Roussel has three children from his first marriage.

In January 2016, it was announced that Roussel is engaged to fashion designer Tory Burch, whom he had been dating since June 2014, and married in 2018.

References 

French businesspeople
Living people
LVMH people
Wharton School of the University of Pennsylvania alumni
1965 births